Alexandru Bodnar (born June 28, 1990 in Rădăuţi) is an athlete from Romania, who competes in archery.

2008 Summer Olympics
At the 2008 Summer Olympics in Beijing Bodnar finished his ranking round with a total of 614 points, which gave him the 60th seed for the final competition bracket in which he faced Wan Khalmizam in the first round. Bodnar won the match by 106-105 and qualified for the second round. Here Juan Carlos Stevens was too strong with 108-101.

References

1990 births
Living people
Romanian male archers
Archers at the 2008 Summer Olympics
Olympic archers of Romania
People from Rădăuți